Tourgéville is a commune in the Calvados department in the Normandy region in northwestern France.

The Deauville-Clairefontaine Racecourse is located on the territory of the commune.

Population

See also
 Côte Fleurie
Communes of the Calvados department
Tourgeville, diary of a small Normandy village - news clippings from the 19th and 20th century

References

Communes of Calvados (department)
Calvados communes articles needing translation from French Wikipedia